Holiday World & Splashin' Safari (known as Santa Claus Land prior to 1984) is a combination theme park and water park located near Interstate 64 and U.S. 231 in Santa Claus, Indiana, United States. The theme park is divided into four sections that celebrate Christmas, Halloween, Thanksgiving and the Fourth of July with rides, live entertainment, games, and attractions.

Holiday World contains three wooden roller coasters: The Raven, The Legend, and The Voyage, as well as Thunderbird (a Bolliger & Mabillard launched Wing Coaster) and The Howler. The safari-themed water park includes the world's two longest water coasters, Wildebeest and Guinness World Record Holder Mammoth; additionally, it contains a launched dueling water coaster named Cheetah Chase, numerous family raft rides and water slides, two wave pools, a junior-sized wave pool, two children's-sized water slide areas, a lazy river, and one family "tipping bucket".  In keeping with its family friendly atmosphere, the park's Halloween celebration is tamer than at most amusement parks.

History

Santa Claus Land

Construction
Plans for Santa Claus Land were first conceived as a retirement project by Louis J. Koch, a retired industrialist from Evansville, Indiana. In 1941, Koch visited the town of Santa Claus, Indiana. Upset that children came to a town named Santa Claus only to be dismayed when Santa Claus wasn't there, Koch developed the idea for a park where children could have fun and visit Santa year-round. Although initial construction plans were delayed by World War II, construction of Santa Claus Land eventually began on August 4, 1945. At this time, Indiana had only one amusement park which was Indiana Beach (at the time called Ideal Beach) that had opened in 1926, 20 years before Santa Claus Land opened.

Opening to 1954
Santa Claus Land opened on August 3, 1946. At no cost, the park offered a Santa, a toy shop, toy displays, a restaurant and themed children's rides, one of which was The Freedom Train. With the park's success, Louis Koch's son, William A. "Bill" Koch, Sr., took over as head of Santa Claus Land. In the following years, Bill Koch continued to add to the park, including the first Jeep-Go-Round ever manufactured, a new restaurant and a deer farm which was eventually home to fourteen European white fallow deer.

1955 to 1975

Beginning in 1955, Santa Claus Land charged admission for the first time; adults were charged 50 cents while children continued to be admitted for free. Despite the new cost of admission, attendance continued to grow with the park. The Pleasureland ride section, which exists today as Rudolph's Reindeer Ranch, debuted in 1955. In the early 1970s, additional children's rides, including Dasher's Seahorses, Comet's Rockets, Blitzen's Airplanes, and Prancer's Merry-Go-Round, were added to this section. From 1959 to 1961, the first live entertainment, the Willie Bartley Water Ski Thrill Show, performed on Lake Rudolph each summer. A Santa Claus Choir composed of local children also performed at the park in 1970 and 1971.

In 1960, Bill Koch married Patricia "Pat" Yellig, the daughter of Jim Yellig, the park's Santa Claus. Bill and Pat Koch would have five children: Will, Kristi, Daniel, Philip, and Natalie.

1976 to 1983
In 1976, Santa Claus Land shifted its focus along with its entrance, which was moved from State Road 162 to its present location on State Road 245. The park began to focus on families, rather than just children. The park added nine new rides by 1984, eight of which they hoped would appeal to older children and adults alike. Eagle's Flight, Rough Riders, Roundhouse, Virginia Reel, Scarecrow Scrambler, Lewis & Clark Trail, Paul Revere's Midnight Ride and Thunder Bumpers on Chesapeake Bay were all targeted towards families, while Dancer's Thunder Bumpers Junior was built for children who weren't quite ready for the larger version of the ride.

Holiday World

1984 to 1992
By 1984, the Koch Family had realized the theming possibilities beyond Christmas. Santa Claus Land soon saw the first major expansion in park history with the addition of a Halloween section and a Fourth of July section. With the inclusion of more than just Christmas, Santa Claus Land formally changed its name to Holiday World. In the following years, Frightful Falls and Banshee were added to the Halloween section, Raging Rapids was added to the Fourth of July section in 1990, and Kringle's Kafé restaurant was built in the Christmas section.

It was also during this time period that Holiday World saw a change in leadership. Will Koch, the eldest of Bill Koch's children, took over as President of the park. Another of Bill Koch's children, Daniel "Dan" Koch, became chairman of the board.

Holiday World & Splashin' Safari

1993 to 2005
In 1993, the water park Splashin' Safari opened. In its first year of operation, Splashin' Safari operated with Congo River, Crocodile Isle, AmaZOOM and Bamboo Chute. The Wave was added the following year.

The park added the first of its three wooden roller coasters in 1995 with The Raven, built by Custom Coasters International. The Raven was named "Ride of the Year" and was voted as the world's second best wooden roller coaster. In 2000, The Raven was ranked as the #1 wooden roller coaster in the world by Amusement Today magazine, a distinction it held for 4 years. As of the 2011 awards, The Raven has remained ranked among the top twenty wooden roller coasters in the world.

Over the next four years, the park made only two additions. The first was the addition of Monsoon Lagoon in Splashin' Safari. The second was the replacement of Firecracker with Holidog's FunTown, a children's play area featuring Holidog's Treehouse, The Howler, Doggone Trail and Magic Waters.

In 2000, Custom Coasters International added another wooden roller coaster. The Legend, based on Washington Irving's "The Legend of Sleepy Hollow", was opened immediately adjacent to The Raven and is taller, longer, and faster than The Raven. The Legend's ranking reached its peak in 2002, when it was voted the fourth best wooden roller coaster in the world. Much like The Raven, The Legend continues to be ranked among the top twenty wooden roller coasters in the world, as of the 2011 awards. In 2000, the park also began offering its guests free unlimited soft drinks, a service which brought international attention to the park. Holiday World was the first park in the world to offer this service to its guests.

For the next five years, the park's additions grew steadily. In 2002, ZOOMbabwe, the world's largest enclosed water slide, was added to Splashin' Safari. In 2003, Splashin' Safari added Zinga on top of The Legend's spiral drop, a ProSlide Tornado, while Holiday World replaced Banshee with Hallowswings and the Hall of Famous Americans wax museum with Liberty Launch. In 2004, the park continued to add onto the water park, adding Jungle Racer and Jungle Jets. Bahari Wave Pool was added in 2005, which marked the beginning of an expansion project that would double the size of Splashin' Safari.

Holiday World & Splashin' Safari received its most sought after award in 2004, when it earned the Applause Award from the International Association of Amusement Parks and Attractions. To win the award, awarded every two years, a park must show "foresight, originality and creativity, plus sound business development and profitability." With an attendance of 883,000 that year, Holiday World was the smallest park to ever receive the award.

2006 to 2013

The 2006 season marked the 60th anniversary of Holiday World. The park marked it by adding a brand new section: Thanksgiving. To complement the section, the park added two new rides. The first was Gobbler Getaway, a Sally Corporation interactive dark ride. The anchor attraction was the park's third wooden roller coaster, The Voyage, built by The Gravity Group, successors of Custom Coasters International. The addition of The Voyage gained the park national attention once again, as the roller coaster claimed the record for most air-time of any wooden roller coaster at 24.2 seconds. It is also the second longest wooden roller coaster in the world behind only The Beast at Kings Island. In its first year of operation, The Voyage was awarded the title of "Best New Ride" and #2 wooden roller coaster in the world. From 2007 to 2011, The Voyage was awarded the title of #1 wooden roller coaster in the world by the readers of Amusement Today magazine. Also added in 2006 was Bahari River in Splashin' Safari. It was named the "Best New Waterpark Ride" by Amusement Today magazine.

Over the next three years, Holiday World & Splashin' Safari opened several new additions. Bakuli and Kima Bay were added to Splashin' Safari, Turkey Whirl and Plymouth Rock Café were added to the Thanksgiving section, the Star Spangled Carousel replaced Thunder Bumpers on Chesapeake Bay in the Fourth of July section, and Reindeer Games replaced Kids Castle in the Christmas section. In 2009, Holiday World continued to break records by opening the world's tallest water ride, Pilgrims Plunge, in the Thanksgiving section of the park. Pilgrims Plunge deviated from the standard of using a sloped lift hill, instead opting for an open-air elevator system that takes riders to a height of  before dropping them at a forty-five degree angle. Pilgrims Plunge was renamed to Giraffica in 2013 when the boundaries between the Thanksgiving section and the water park were slightly altered.

Splashin' Safari broke another record in 2010, when Wildebeest was opened. It was also among the first water coasters to use linear induction motors, rather than water jets or conveyor belts, to propel riders up hills. Wildebeest was named "Best New Waterpark Ride" in 2010, as well as "Best Waterpark Ride" in 2010, 2011 and 2012. The park broke its own record just two years later, in 2012, when Mammoth opened.

In February 2010, Holiday World's rival park, Kentucky Kingdom in Louisville, Kentucky, announced that it would be closing permanently and ending operations after park operator Six Flags could not reach a lease agreement for the property. Several members of the Koch family later expressed interest into reviving the park in 2012, but later backed out of the deal. This park would eventually reopen under different management in 2014.

The park suffered a sudden loss in June 2010 when President and CEO Will Koch died while swimming at his home. Although the Spencer County coroner listed the official cause of death as drowning, family and park officials believe Koch's type 1 diabetes played a factor in his death. Soon after his death, Holiday World & Splashin' Safari named Will's younger brother Dan as the park's new president. Dan Koch served as the park's president until late 2012, shortly after which the board of directors announced Matt Eckert as the new president, launching a bitter fight within the family for control of the park and its assets. Matt Eckert was previously one of the parks two general managers. Eckert is the first park President not related to the Koch family.

Will Koch's widow Lori and their three children won primary ownership in the park after an ugly court battle and its parent company, Koch Development Corporation. Dan Koch, along with his sister Natalie, would go on in 2014 to form Koch Family Parks and buy Alabama Splash Adventure, a previously troubled theme park in Bessemer, Alabama.

In recent years, the park has replaced some of its older rides with newer rides. Due to limited vertical clearance for Sparkler, the park decided to relocate Star Spangled Carousel to the former location of Paul Revere's Midnight Ride and to place Sparkler in the carousel's place. The following year, Holiday World removed part of Holidog's Treehouse to make room for a new tea cup ride called Kitty's Tea Party. In 2013, the park also removed the only original remaining ride, The Freedom Train, citing maintenance concerns; it was replaced by another train ride which the park named Holidog Express. In Splashin' Safari, Jungle Jets was replaced with Safari Sam's SplashLand in 2011. In 2013, AmaZOOM, Bamboo Chute, Congo River, and Crocodile Isle were removed to make room for a new Splashin' Safari entry plaza; in its place, Hyena Falls and Hyena Springs were added to the north of Giraffica.

2014 and 2015 expansions
On September 6, 2013, Holiday World announced plans for a 2014 expansion totaling $8 million. The highlight of the announcement was a new swinging ship ride called the Mayflower, which is located in the park's Thanksgiving section just to the north of Gobbler Getaway. This ride is the first of a series of rides intended to bring the focus back on the theme park after several years of major additions to the water park. Mayflower has a capacity of 60 riders and swings 54 feet over a pool of water. In addition to Mayflower, the park announced a new restaurant and shop in Splashin' Safari, more cabanas, additional benches and shade structures, parking lot improvements, and the addition of fireworks on Friday nights between June 13 and August 1.

Giraffica closed at the end of the 2013 season and was removed before the start of the 2014 season citing technical problems.

On July 24, 2014, the park announced the construction of Thunderbird, a launched Bolliger & Mabillard Wing Coaster, for the 2015 season, occupying the area north of Hyena Falls and intertwining with The Voyage. This is B&M's first launched coaster (The Incredible Hulk Coaster at Universal's Islands of Adventure's launch was created by Universal, not B&M). It is also the park's first major steel roller coaster, as The Raven, The Legend, and The Voyage are all wooden.

2020 expansion
On August 6, 2019, Holiday World formally announced the construction of Cheetah Chase, for the 2020 season, a dueling launched ProSlide water coaster, occupying an area near the track of The Voyage in Splashin' Safari. Cheetah Chase features a track with a length of over 1,700 feet and a maximum speed of over 20 miles per hour. It is the park's first launched water coaster and their third major water coaster.

Themed areas
Holiday World is divided into four holiday-themed sections: Christmas, Halloween, Fourth of July and Thanksgiving. Each of the sections features rides, games, food and other attractions that follow the theme of that section's respective holiday. The music that plays over the loud speakers in each section is also themed to that section's respective holiday; guests will often notice the music change as they enter a different section. Splashin' Safari, which is connected to the theme park via entrances in the Halloween and Thanksgiving sections, takes the general theme of a safari.

Christmas
Upon entering Holiday World, guests immediately enter the Christmas section. The Christmas section is the oldest section of Holiday World, dating back to 1946. It was also the only themed area of the park until 1984. Although devoid of any major rides, there is a small sub-section called Rudolph's Reindeer Ranch which is home to several small children's rides. Notable landmarks in this section include a Santa Claus statue, a Christmas tree, a nativity scene and the Applause fountain, which was added after the park was awarded the IAAPA Applause Award in 2004. Prior to 2019, the Christmas section of the park included one of the park's two air-conditioned restaurants, Kringle's Kafé, which served standard theme park food items such as burgers, pizza, and ice cream. In 2019, it was replaced by the addition of Santa's Merry Marketplace, which expanded upon both the capacity, size, and available food of Kringle's Kafé. Since the park's opening in 1946, Santa Claus has been available daily throughout the season to chat with children.

Halloween
The Halloween section was one of two new holidays added in 1984. Two of the three wooden roller coasters in the park are located here: The Raven and The Legend. The area also has a Goblin Burgers restaurant, which resembles a witch's house, the Frightful Falls log flume that intertwines with The Legend, and the main entrance to Splashin' Safari water park. Apart from the architecture, guests will hear the school bell from The Legend's station ringing ominously throughout the section. It introduced Kitty Claws as its mascot in 2012.

Fourth of July
The Fourth of July section was the second of the two sections that were added in 1984, named for the date of Independence Day in the United States and which is commonly used to refer to the holiday itself. It introduced George the Eagle as its mascot. This area features more attractions than any of the four sections in the theme park. Landmarks in this section include the Hoosier Celebration Theater, where many live shows are performed; the Good Old Days Picnic Grove, where numerous shelter houses may be rented out for company picnics; and The Alamo restaurant, which serves traditional Mexican food. The Fourth of July section is also home to a sub-section called Holidog's FunTown, a children's play area which is completely encircled by Holidog Express. Keeping with the Fourth of July theme, there is also a monument with several American flags located right across from The Alamo restaurant in the center of the section.

Holidog's FunTown

Thanksgiving
The Thanksgiving section is the newest section of the park, added in 2006 to commemorate Holiday World's 60th anniversary. The anchor attraction of this section is The Voyage which wraps around parts of the midway; guests walk under The Voyage's brake run upon entering the section through Fourth of July. In the back of the Thanksgiving section is Thunderbird, the wing coaster, and a secondary entrance to Splashin' Safari. In addition to The Voyage and Thunderbird, the Thanksgiving section includes the second of the park's two air-conditioned restaurants: Plymouth Rock Café, which serves typical Thanksgiving food such as turkey, prime rib, stuffing, green beans and bread rolls. Turkeys can often be heard "gobbling" throughout the section as sounds emanate from the Gobbler Getaway ride and Pilgrims' Challenge game.

Splashin' Safari
Splashin' Safari, the water park Holiday World added in 1993, has consistently ranked among the best water parks in the United States, even being named as the #1 water park in the United States by TripAdvisor in 2011. The water park takes the general theme of a safari, with ride names featuring various animals, rivers and Swahili words. Holiday World has added onto its water park every year from 2002 to 2013. Among those additions are the world's two longest water coasters: Wildebeest and Mammoth, which are also, respectively, the fourth and second most expensive additions ever made to the park. Unlike a number of other theme parks that necessitate a separate admission fee for the water park, entry to Splashin' Safari is included with admission to Holiday World.

Defunct rides and attractions

Mascots and characters

Rather than sign licensed characters for the park, Holiday World has developed several mascots and characters including:
 Santa Claus– A jolly old man who is the mascot of the Christmas section.
 Holidog – A brown dog who is the mascot of Holiday World.
 Safari Sam – A green crocodile who is the mascot of Splashin' Safari.
 George the Eagle – A bald eagle wearing patriotic clothing who is the mascot of the Fourth of July section.
 Kitty Claws – A black cat wearing a Halloween-themed tutu, ballet shoes, a bow, and a miniature masquerade mask who is the mascot of the Halloween section. Introduced in 2012.

Entertainment
Holiday World & Splashin' Safari offers a variety of live entertainment, including singing, dancing and diving. All shows are performed at least six days per week when the park is in daily operation.
 Santa's Storytime Theater – This is a theater where children are invited to sit with Santa Claus on stage as he reads a story and sings Christmas songs. During hot weather, Santa appears in the air-conditioned gift shop, St. Nick's Gifts.
 Holiday Theater – This is an indoor theater that is no longer used for shows during the summer hours. During Happy Halloween Weekends, the theater hosts Holidog's 3D Adventure Maze. 
 Dive! – Located at the High Dive Theater, "Dive!" is a daily show where divers perform numerous dives detailing the history of diving. In another portion of the show, a diver nicknamed "Hot Stuff" lights themselves on fire before dancing to the song "Hot Stuff" and diving into the water.
 Hoosier Celebration Theater – This theater is an outdoor theater where a number of live shows are performed daily. Shows performed at this theater including: Celebrate! and Holidog's Dance Party.
 Holidog's All-Star Theater – This is a theater located inside of Holidog's FunTown that has shows geared toward children and features Holidog, Safari Sam, and Kitty Claws (See: Mascots and Characters) singing and dancing to a variety of songs.
 Muziki Bay – This is a theater located in Splashin' Safari that has a small stage surrounded by a shallow pool. Shows performed at this theater include: Beach Blast at the Bay and Safari Sam's Beach Bash.

Special events
 Weddings: – Through the years, Holiday World has been the host of several weddings. Couples have been married on the defunct Bungee Jump, in The Wave wave pool, and in a hot air balloon tethered at the park. In 1995, a dozen couples, who completely filled the ride, were simultaneously married on The Raven. A couple was also married atop the lift hill of The Voyage by an Elvis impersonator in 2008.
 Golden Ticket Awards: – Since 1998, Amusement Today magazine has brought dozens of amusement park industry leaders together to honor the best of the best at an annual event called the Golden Ticket Awards. Holiday World has hosted this event three times. Holiday World & Splashin' Safari was the first ever park to host the event in 2000. Holiday World also hosted the awards in 2006 and 2011. The awards ceremony has been hosted in Holiday Theater in the Christmas section.
 Play Day: – Every year since 1993, Holiday World & Splashin' Safari has hosted thousands of children with mental and physical disabilities for an event called "Play Day". Play Day is for invited guests of the Easter Seals Rehabilitation Center of Southwestern Indiana. The admission price proceeds are donated to the Easter Seals. As of 2011, Holiday World has raised over $257,000 for the Easter Seals Rehabilitation Center.
 Walk to Cure Diabetes: – Every year since 2006, Holiday World has hosted thousands of walkers for the "Holiday World Walk to Cure Diabetes", which is a walk to raise money for the Juvenile Diabetes Research Foundation (JDRF). To raise money, Holiday World donates tickets to walkers who have raised money for JDRF. As of 2011, over $1.7 million has been raised for JDRF with the help of Holiday World.
 HoliWood Nights: – HoliWood Nights is an event held for card-carrying members of recognized amusement park-related clubs and their registered guests. The event features exclusive ride time (ERT) on the park's three wooden roller coasters, plus a select few other rides, both before park opening and after park closing. The event, which was first known as Stark Raven Mad, was temporarily discontinued in 2003 following a death during the event (See: Incidents). In 2006, the event returned after being renamed HoliWood Nights. The park embraces HoliWood's pun on Hollywood by naming each year's event as a play on the title of a movie. The theme of the 2013 event is "Dig", which is a play on the 1988 movie Big.
 Rock the World: – Since 2012, Holiday World has hosted a Christian music festival called Rock the World on a select Saturday in August. Throughout the day, regional contemporary Christian bands perform in the Hoosier Celebration Theater. Once the park closes for the day, a main stage area opens to those with concert tickets. The main stage features a number of nationally known Christian artists and bands who perform well past normal closing hours. (The main stage acts in 2012 were Jeremy Camp, Tenth Avenue North, BarlowGirl and Hearts of Saints).
 Happy Halloween Weekends: – Since 2012, Holiday World has remained open in October to hold an event called Happy Halloween Weekends. For the last two weekends in September plus the four weekends in October, the park holds family-friendly, Halloween-themed activities. Some of these seasonal attractions include two corn mazes, hayrides, a 3-D walk-through attraction similar to a family-friendly haunted house and a family activity area geared towards children located in the Good Ol' Days Picnic Grove. The park transforms itself into a solely Halloween-themed park, with Halloween decorations, Halloween-themed shows and special Halloween-themed food items. These attractions are hosted in addition to the park's normal offerings of rides, games and food.

Awards
In 2004, Holiday World & Splashin' Safari was presented the Applause Award. To receive this honor, a park must show "foresight, originality and creativity, plus sound business development and profitability." With an attendance of 883,000 that year, Holiday World was the smallest park to ever receive the award. The park celebrated by installing a large replica of the award's trophy as well as commemorative plaques naming other recipients of the award as part of a fountain in the Christmas section.

Holiday World & Splashin' Safari has also received numerous Golden Ticket Awards, which are presented by Amusement Today magazine to the best of the best in the amusement park industry. At 51, Holiday World has received more Golden Ticket Awards than any other amusement park in the world, as of 2016.

Incidents

The Raven
 On May 31, 2003, a 32-year-old female from New York City died after falling out of The Raven roller coaster. The victim was visiting the park to attend "Stark Raven Mad 2003", an event hosting roller coaster enthusiasts from around the country. At approximately 8:00 pm, the victim and her fiancé boarded The Raven in the last row of the train. Following a safety check of her lap bar and seat belt by a ride operator, the train left the station. Multiple witnesses reported that they saw her "virtually standing up" during the ride's initial and subsequent drops. During the ride's  drop, also called the fifth drop, she was ejected from the car and onto the tracks. When the train returned to the station, the victim's fiancé, ride operators and a passenger who was a doctor ran back along the tracks, at which point they found her lying under the structure of the roller coaster at the fifth drop. The doctor, aided by park medical personnel, began CPR until an ambulance arrived. The victim was pronounced dead en route to the hospital.

An investigation following the accident showed that the safety restraints were working properly and that there were no mechanical deficiencies on the roller coaster. Additionally, the victim's seatbelt was found undone when the train returned to the station. A subsequent 2005 lawsuit filed by the family against Holiday World and the Philadelphia Toboggan Company, the manufacturer of the coaster train, was settled out of court in 2007. Terms of the settlement were not disclosed.

Lawnmowing accident
 On May 27, 2006, a 20-year-old male park employee from Birdseye, Indiana died after being pinned under the lawn mower he was using. The man was a supervisor for the park's grounds department. The employee was working alone, mowing an area with some inclines outside the east side of the park when the incident occurred, though the park refused to speculate on exactly what might have happened. The man was found by another employee, who was then able to help lift the lawn mower off the victim with the help of other employees. Park emergency medical technicians and Spencer County EMS summoned a medical helicopter from St. Mary's Hospital and Medical Center in Evansville, Indiana, but the employee was pronounced dead before it arrived.

The Wave
 On July 4, 2007, at 11:00 a.m., a 29-year-old female from Fort Wayne, Indiana died after collapsing near the edge of The Wave, falling face-down into two inches of water. Lifeguards immediately responded and pulled her out, then attempted to revive her with help from park medical personnel. Resuscitation attempts continued as the victim was transported by ambulance to Jasper Memorial Hospital, where she died. An autopsy determined the cause of death to be congestive heart failure.

Bahari River
 On June 20, 2009, a filter pump on Bahari River malfunctioned, sending twenty-four guests and employees to the hospital. At 6:25 pm, the pump, which was turned off at the time, was turned back on. The pump surged, forcing a stronger than usual concentration of liquid bleach and hydrochloric acid into the water. Twenty-four people, including park staff and medical personnel, complained of troubled breathing and nausea. They were given oxygen at the park before being transported to Jasper Memorial Hospital for treatment. All were treated and released that evening. It was later determined that an interlock system designed to prevent chemical feeders from pumping chemicals into the water when the pump was turned off had malfunctioned.

Bomb scare
 On June 30, 2016, a suspicious unattended backpack was found, causing an evacuation of the entire park.

The Voyage
 On June 4, 2021, 47-year-old Dawn Jankovic, from Brunswick, Ohio, returned to the station of The Voyage unresponsive. EMTs arrived three minutes later and immediately began to render first aid to her. It was closed for the rest of that night, and it was determined later that the ride was operating as intended with no mechanical problems, and it reopened the very next day. Jankovic later died at Memorial Hospital in Jasper, Indiana.

References

External links

 Official website for Holiday World & Splashin' Safari
 

 
Amusement parks in Indiana
Water parks in Indiana
Parks in Southwestern Indiana
Tourist attractions in Spencer County, Indiana
Buildings and structures in Spencer County, Indiana
1946 establishments in Indiana
Amusement parks opened in 1946